Javier de la Cueva (Madrid, 1962), is a lawyer specialized in issues related to technology and the Internet. He graduated in Law and is Doctor in Philosophy from the Complutense University of Madrid. He has defended numerous cases involving the use of free licenses of intellectual property.

Early years
In the beginning he enrolled at the Complutense University of Madrid  for a degree in law. Later he obtained a doctorate in Philosophy from the same university. He is currently working as a lawyer and professor of subjects related to intellectual property at the University Complutense de Madrid and at the IE School of Human Sciences & Technology.

Case Ladinamo

For the first time in the judicial history joins a resolution Copyleft concept. According to Javier de la Cueva, had succeeded official record that there were artists who wanted to distance themselves from the policy followed by the management companies of Copyright, relying on the use of alternatives to restrictive Copyright licenses.
His objective in the short and medium term is to introduce the notion of Copyleft in as many judgments and possible administrative files as possible, consequently in the books of jurisprudence analysis. Only then can end the monopoly exercised in Europe entities managing Copyright.

Case Sharemula

Sharemula  is a website which provided links to P2P networks, and that his case was jointly defended by Javier de la Cueva and David Bravo Bueno. The hearing confirmed the thesis defense noting that bind to peer networks (P2P) is not a criminal activity.

Case e-barcelona.org
E-barcelona.org was a discussion platform on cultural policies founded by the artist and activist  Daniel García Andújar, and was part of a wide network such as e-sevilla, e-valencia, etc. 
Vegap filed a impeachment against Daniel García Andújar as the ultimate responsible and administrator of e-barcelona.org for disclosure of secrets and copyright in 2008. Defended by Javier de la Cueva, the judge decides to dismiss the proceedings in May 2015.

Position before CEDRO

Javier de la Cueva refers CEDRO as the SGAE in books world, his fundamental criticism is based on the claim to a private association that appropriates scientific research in universities. This company manages the rights of writers and editors, calls on universities pay a fee for the material used in its virtual campus. 
CEDRO sued the university centers and demanded 5 euro fee for each student. Universities lost lawsuits because the reasoning used for photocopiers always applied, regardless speaking of virtual campus, which is completely different.

References

External links 
 Official Website of Javier de la Cueva
 Official Website of David Bravo

1962 births
Living people
Copyright activists
20th-century Spanish lawyers
21st-century Spanish lawyers